Air Centrafrique was the flag carrier of the Central African Republic from 1966 to the late 1970s. The company operated domestic services. It had its headquarters in Bangui.

History

The carrier was formed as Compagnie Centre Africaine Air Bangui in 1966 in association with Air Afrique and Union de Transports Aériens (UTA), with the latter providing management and technical assistance. It was conceived to provide feeder services to Air Afrique. Operations started in early 1967, linking Bangui with Berberati using Douglas DC-3 aircraft. In , a Beech 95 Baron was acquired for flying new routes to Bakouma and Bangassou.

Gaining flag carrier status, the company was renamed Air Centrafrique in mid-1971 following reorganisation after the government attempted to withdraw from the Air Afrique consortium earlier that year.

The launching of Air Centrafrique as an independent airline was one of the moves of the proclaimed Emperor Bokassa I that indebted the country, to the point that banks began to refuse loans to the state in the same year. Following the rupture with Air Afrique, agreements were signed with Zaire, Congo and Chad for Air Centrafrique to fly to those destinations. On 1973-2-13, Bokassa issued a decree suspending operations of Air Centrafrique, due to a conflict with French navigation staff.

By , passenger scheduled services to Bangui, Bambari, Bangassou, Birao, Bouar, Bria, Carnot, M'Boki, Ouadda and Zemio were operated; seasonal flights were also undertaken during the safari hunting period. A Caravelle 3 entered the fleet in the late 1970s.

The airline ceased operations between 1978 and 1979. The collapse of Air Centrafrique, along with other debacles of the Bokassa legacy, contributed to undermining the prestige of the Central African Republic internationally.

Destinations
Following is a list of destinations served by Air Centrafrique all through its history:

Fleet
Air Centrafrique operated the following aircraft throughout its history:
Beech Baron
Douglas DC-3
Douglas DC-4
DC-8-55
Sud Aviation Caravelle III

See also		
 List of defunct airlines of the Central African Republic
Transport in the Central African Republic

Notes

References

Bibliography

Airlines established in 1966
Defunct airlines of the Central African Republic
Airlines disestablished in 1979
Bangui
1966 establishments in the Central African Republic
1979 disestablishments in the Central African Republic